Michael Hendry (born 20 December 1965) was a Scottish footballer who played for Queen's Park, Stirling Albion, Alloa Athletic and Dumbarton.

References

1965 births
Scottish footballers
Dumbarton F.C. players
Queen's Park F.C. players
Stirling Albion F.C. players
Alloa Athletic F.C. players
Scottish Football League players
Living people
Association football forwards
Footballers from Renfrewshire
Arthurlie F.C. players
People from Bishopton